Delìrivm Còrdia is the third studio album by American avant-garde metal band Fantômas, released on January 27, 2004, by record label Ipecac.

Style

Music
The music, which was composed solely by Patton, could be described as the score to a horror movie and/or concept album centering on the theme of surgery without anesthesia. The album consists of a single track that runs for 74 minutes and 17 seconds.

Several music genres and styles are covered over the course of the album, including easy listening, chanting, drone, noise and metal, generally being separated by ambience and sounds and voices in a surgical setting. There are no lyrics or song structures as such as one would traditionally expect; the band instead focuses on atmosphere and the creation of suspense through the use of eerie noises, wordless vocals, and sudden, jarring changes in volume and intensity. Approximately the last 20 minutes of the track consist of the sound of a turntable stylus stuck in the runout groove of a record. The track then ends abruptly, with the sound of someone counting in a fast tempo, followed immediately by the stylus sliding across a record's surface.

Artwork
The booklet contains graphic photos of actual surgeries in which organs are seen being removed from human bodies from Max Aguilera's book The Sacred Heart: An Atlas of the Body Seen Through Invasive Surgery. Low-resolution images can be viewed here.

A quote on the label backcard reads: "Like the surgeon, the composer slashes open the body of his fellow man, removes his eyes, empties his abdomen of organs, hangs him up on a hook holding up to the light all of the body's palpitating treasures sending a burst of light into its innermost depths." The quote is attributed to Richard Selzer M.D., who is also credited with "voices." This quote is paraphrased from Selzer's introduction to Max Aguilera's book, though it replaces the word "photographer" (Aguilera's profession) with "composer."

The font used for all text contained on the album uses V in place of U (with the exception of the "Max Aguilera" and "Manufactured and Distributed by Caroline Distributions"), presumably a nod to Latin spelling conventions. For example, "Buzz Osborne - Trevor Dunn" is written on the back as "Bvzz Osborne - Trevor Dvnn", etc.

Reception

Delìrivm Còrdia was met with mixed to positive reviews. Review aggregation site Metacritic lists its average score as 65 out of 100, characterising its reception as "generally favourable". AllMusic gave the album four stars out of five, and Stylus rated it B+, calling it "a balefully themed exercise in prompting your imagination". Rolling Stone awarded it three out of five stars, describing the 20-plus-minute end section as "maddening", though noting that it "demands repeated listens, if only to hear the freakish wonder that is Mike Patton's voice". Pitchfork were more critical, giving the album 5.9 out of 10, calling it "gloomy background music, and little else" though praising the "intensity" of Dave Lombardo's drumming.

Track listing

Note: The phrase "Surgical Sound Specimens from the Museum of Skin" (written on the back of the box) and the Richard Selzer M.D. quote (shown above) are both sometimes referred to as the actual name of the piece, however it is officially known simply as Delìrivm Còrdia.

Personnel
Mike Patton – vocals, samples, vocal percussion, producer, arrangement, design/layout
Dave Lombardo – drums
Buzz Osborne – guitar
Trevor Dunn – bass
Max Aguilera-Hellweg – photography (taken with permission from the book The Sacred Heart: An Atlas of the Body Seen Through Invasive Surgery, Bullfinch Press)
S. Husky Höskulds – engineer
Mott Lange – assistant engineer
Gene Grimaldi – mastering
Martin Kvamme – artwork
Richard Selzer – voices

Chart performance

References

External links 

 

Fantômas (band) albums
2004 albums
Concept albums
Ipecac Recordings albums